Antonia Sophia E. Clarke (born 24 May 1995) is an English actress and singer. Her films include Altar (2014) and All My Friends Hate Me (2021). On television, she is known for her roles as young Emmeline in the BBC Two film The Thirteenth Tale (2013) and Mary, Queen of Scots in the Starz series The Serpent Queen (2022).

Early life and education
Clarke was born in Hammersmith and grew up in Brackenbury Village, West London. At the age of 15, Clarke attended Downe House boarding school in Berkshire. It was here she decided she wanted to be an actress. She studied History of Art at Goldsmiths, University of London and later graduated with Master of Arts in Film Aesthetics and Philosophy from the University of Oxford.

Career
Clarke made her television debut in an episode of the 2011 action series M.I. High. She made her film debut in the 2012 adaptation of the musical Les Misérables, performing the song "Lovely Ladies".

Her first major role came out as Young Emmeline in  James Kent's 2013 drama film The Thirteenth Tale alongside Olivia Colman and Sophie Turner.

In 2014, she had a small role in the romantic comedy film Magic in the Moonlight. Also in 2014 she appeared in Altar Directed By Nick Willing. The filming of the movie was described as "intimate". Clarke played "Penny   Hamilton".

Clarke played Maria Feodorovna in the Sky Atlantic and HBO miniseries Catherine the Great. She appeared in the 2021 comedy horror All My Friends Hate Me. The following year, she starred as Mary, Queen of Scots in the Starz historical drama The Serpent Queen.

Personal life
Clarke owns a Jackadoodle dog. She has stated her favourite books are To Kill A Mockingbird by Harper Lee and Just Kids by Patti Smith.

Filmography

Film

Television

Stage
 The Flick (2018), as Rose, at Michael Pilch Studio, Oxford

References

External links
 
 
 

Living people
1994 births
21st-century English actresses
Actresses from London
Alumni of Goldsmiths, University of London
Alumni of the University of Oxford
English film actresses
English television actresses
People educated at Downe House School
People from Hammersmith